Reel Grrls is a non-profit organization in Seattle, Washington. It is the only year-round filmmaking and media literacy program in the country specifically for teenage girls.  According to their website,

"Reel Grrls envisions a world in which women and girls have leadership roles in creating media and are represented behind and in front of the camera."
"Reel Grrls is the premier year-round media-training program for girls. At Reel Grrls, girls ages 9 - 21 learn production skills through hands-on workshops and classes taught by female media professionals and educators. Since 2001, over 1000 students have participated in Reel Grrls programs and Reel Grrls media have been honored in more than 90 film festivals globally. Reel Grrls is a 501c(3) non-profit organization located in Seattle's Central District."

History
Reel Grrls was founded by Malory Graham, a filmmaker who got fed up with being a part of the exploitation of women when she worked in corporate media, and noticed that in the youth media classes she began teaching the boys were always behind the cameras and the girls in front. Since its first program in 2001, Reel Grrls has grown into a stand-alone non-profit organization with year-round programming for girls ages 13–19. Several programs take place throughout the year, lasting from one day to 9 months, covering skills such as basic camera, professional non-linear editing, advanced cinematography, animation, VJing and soundtrack recording.

The present Executive Director is Ilona Rossman Ho, succeeding Robin Held.

Participants most often create films based on issues in their own lives or ones that they don't see covered by the mainstream media. The program has a strong media literacy component, stressing the need for young women to be able to understand and interpret the media targeting them and to talk back to it in their own voices, ones that are not often heard in the mainstream. The organization is committed to serving a diverse population of girls, and offers scholarships to many of their participants. Past work has included films about living as a homeless youth, racial stereotypes, working past a generational cycle of addiction, teen dating violence and LGBT issues. Films made by Reel Grrls have screened in film festivals all over the world, and many participants have had the chance to travel to the festivals accompanying their work.

Reel Grrls is a part of the growing field of youth media in the United States.

Comcast controversy 
In 2011, a Twitter posting led to controversy involving an $18,000 grant that Comcast had made for 15 teenage girls to attend the program's summer program.  Regarding a merger between Comcast and NBC Universal that was approved 4-1 by the United States Federal Communications Commission, the group tweeted "OMG! @FCC Commissioner Baker voted 2 approve Comcast/NBC merger & is now lving FCC for A JOB AT COMCAST?!? http://su.pr/1trT4z #mediajustice"  The move by FCC Commissioner Meredith Attwell Baker was widely criticized at the time, though Comcast said it did not begin discussions of employment until after the decision.  A vice president of communications at Comcast, Steve Kipp, sent the group a letter that "I hope you can respect that this Tweet has put me in an indefensible position with my bosses.  I cannot continue to ask them to approve funding for Reel Grrls, knowing that the digital footprint your organization has created about Comcast is a negative one" and "Given the fact that Comcast has been a major supporter of Reel Grrls for several years now, I am frankly shocked that your organization is slamming us on Twitter. I cannot in good conscience continue to provide you with funding -- especially when there are so many other deserving nonprofits in town."

The group responded by making a video, and the story came to the notice of the Wall Street Journal, Washington Post, and Associated Press.  Comcast subsequently apologized to the group and said that Kipp's action was "not authorized" and that its funding was "not in jeopardy", but the Huffington Post opined, "Comcast and its foundation have donated $1.8 billion to local nonprofits over the past decade. How many times did those groups have to think twice before saying something about their Internet service or cable bills? How many emails have been written like this that didn't get leaked to the press?"  By contrast, the executive director of another nonprofit, a Boys and Girls Club of Burlington, Vermont, told the New York Times she had submitted a letter favoring the Comcast merger to the FCC after she was sent a draft by Comcast, which had given her organization $20,000 for new equipment.

The group decided to turn down Comcast funds and look for other ways to fund the summer camp.  By June 7, they had raised over $24,000 in private donations from more than 620 donors to fund the summer camp, issuing the statement:

"In light of the events with Comcast last week, we've decided to change the focus of our summer apprenticeship program. Participants will now produce short films exploring media reform and media justice issues in partnership with Free Press and the Center for Media Justice. The program will include a trip to the Allied Media Conference in Detroit for all participants who are able to attend."

References

External links 
Official website

Youth empowerment organizations
Communications and media organizations based in the United States
Seattle articles needing infoboxes
Non-profit organizations based in Seattle